The 2015 ICF Canoe Sprint World Championships, the 41st edition of the World Championships, were held from 19–23 August 2015 in Milan, Italy.

Explanation of events
Canoe sprint competitions are broken up into Canadian canoe (C), an open canoe with a single-blade paddle, or in kayaks (K), a closed canoe with a double-bladed paddle. Each canoe or kayak can hold one person (1), two people (2), or four people (4). When a competition is listed as a C-2 500 m event as an example, it means two people are in a canoe competing at a  distance.

Medal summary

Medal table

Men
 Non-Olympic classes

Canoe

Kayak

Women
 Non-Olympic classes

Canoe

Kayak

Paracanoe

Medal table

 Non-Paralympic classes

References

External links
Official website

2015
Sprint World Championships
2015 in Italian sport
International sports competitions hosted by Italy
Sports competitions in Milan
2015 Canoe Sprint World Championships
Canoeing and kayaking competitions in Italy
August 2015 sports events in Italy